Bandile Mdlalose was the general secretary of the South African shackdwellers' movement Abahlali baseMjondolo. She is now the President of the Community Justice Movement which operates in some informal settlements of Gauteng and KwaZulu Natal.

She is the National Working Committee member of the United Front, elected in December 2014. She was listed in the Mail & Guardian Book of Women for 2012 and was labeled one of South Africa's top 20 youth in 2013.

Arrest in 2013
In October 2013, Bandile Mdlalose was arrested on a charge of public violence at the Marikana land occupation in Durban. The arrest was riddled with controversy as Abahlali baseMjondolo and commentators labeled the arrest as politically motivated and without merit.

She was arrested for showing solidarity with a family whose child had been killed in the protests. She was held at Cato Manor police station, groups such as Amnesty International and War on Want petitioned for her release.

She had difficulty getting bail set but eventually was granted bail of R5,000 on the condition that she not return to Cato Crest.

Philosophy
Bandile Mdlalose wrote that South Africans "live in a Democratic Prison" because democracy sends police and private security to evict poor people and "smash" their struggles. She also wrote an article after her arrest called "Seven days in Prison".

She is also critical of electoral politics and has argued that: "Once you become a political party or when you contest the elections, you then become like them (the politicians)."

References

Living people
South African activists
South African women activists
Shack dwellers
21st-century squatters
Squatter leaders
Housing in South Africa
Year of birth missing (living people)